The 2020 season was the Washington Football Team's 89th in the National Football League and their first under head coach Ron Rivera. The season also marked the first time since their inaugural season as the Braves in 1932 that the team was not known as the Redskins, as they retired the name and logo during the offseason in the wake of the George Floyd protests, after decades of controversy.

The team improved upon its 3–13 record in 2019 by going 7–9 and winning the NFC East for the first time since 2015. In doing so they became only the third team in NFL history to win a division with a losing record after the 2010 Seattle Seahawks and 2014 Carolina Panthers, the latter of which Rivera also coached. It would be followed by the 2022 Tampa Bay Buccaneers. They also became the first team in NFL history to make the playoffs after a 2–7 start. Their season would end with a 23–31 loss to the eventual Super Bowl LV champion Tampa Bay Buccaneers in the Wild Card round. The season also marked the return of quarterback Alex Smith, who suffered a life-threatening leg injury late in the 2018 season and missed the entire 2019 season. Smith was named NFL Comeback Player of the Year, while defensive end Chase Young, selected second overall in the 2020 NFL Draft, was named Defensive Rookie of the Year.

For the fourth time in five seasons, Washington played on Thanksgiving, playing the Dallas Cowboys for the third time in that span. Also notable was their scheduled absence from Monday Night Football for the first time since 1999, although the Week 13 game against the Pittsburgh Steelers was played on a Monday due to COVID-19-related schedule changes affecting the Steelers' previous week. Washington ended up winning that game to hand the 11–0 Steelers their first loss of the season.

Draft

Notes
 Washington traded their second-round selection (No. 34 overall), along with their 2019 second-round selection to the Indianapolis Colts in exchange for the Colts' 2019 first-round selection.
 Washington traded their fifth-round selection to the Carolina Panthers in exchange for quarterback Kyle Allen.
 Washington traded cornerback Quinton Dunbar to the Seattle Seahawks in exchange for a fifth-round selection from Seattle.
 Washington traded their sixth-round selection to the Denver Broncos in exchange for quarterback Case Keenum and the Broncos' seventh-round selection.
 Washington traded offensive tackle Trent Williams to the San Francisco 49ers in exchange for the 49ers' fifth-round selection and a third-round selection in the 2021 draft.

Staff

Final roster

Schedule

Preseason
The team's preseason schedule was announced on May 7, but was later cancelled due to the COVID-19 pandemic.

Regular season
Washington's 2020 schedule was announced on May 7.

Note: Intra-division opponents are in bold text.

Week 1: vs. Philadelphia Eagles 

In their first game as the Washington Football Team, they fell behind 17-0 to the Eagles. Despite the deficit, Washington shut out the Eagles in the second half by accumulating 8 sacks on defense and scoring 27 unanswered points for a 27–17 victory. This was Washington's first victory over the Eagles since Week 14 of the 2016 season, snapping a six-game losing streak against Philadelphia. The win was also the largest comeback against the Eagles in franchise history. With the win, Washington improved to 1–0 for the first time since 2018 (the first time winning a home opener since 2014). Washington also snapped a ten-game division losing streak dating back to 2018.

Week 2: at Arizona Cardinals 

Washington was overmatched by Arizona quarterback Kyler Murray, who had two rushing touchdowns, and could not overcome a 20-0 halftime deficit.

Week 3: at Cleveland Browns 

Haskins threw for a career-high three interceptions and lost one fumble. With the loss, the all-time regular season record for the franchise fell to 604–605–28, making it the first time since 1975 that the record fell below a .500 winning percentage.

Week 4: vs. Baltimore Ravens 

Dwayne Haskins set a career high in passing yards but was benched in favor of Kyle Allen the following week.

Week 5: vs. Los Angeles Rams 

In the second quarter Kyle Allen left the game with what was ruled as an arm injury, leaving Alex Smith to play the remainder of the game. This marked Smith's first NFL game appearance since suffering a severe leg fracture in 2018. Washington's offense was again hampered by quarterback play as they lost 30–10. Their 108 total yards of offense was the fewest by any team in any game all season.

Week 6: at New York Giants 

Giants linebacker Tae Crowder recovered a Kyle Allen fumble for the go-ahead score and Washington responded with a touchdown of their own with 36 seconds remaining. Coach Rivera opted to go for the game-winning two point conversion which fell incomplete. As a result, Washington lost their fifth straight game overall and their fourth consecutive against the Giants.

Week 7: vs. Dallas Cowboys 

Washington's defense had six sacks and only allowed 142 yards of offense. Heading into the bye, the team improved to 2–5, moved to 2–1 in the NFC East, and snapped a three-game losing streak to the Cowboys.

Week 9: vs. New York Giants 

In the first and only game with fans, starting quarterback Kyle Allen suffered a gruesome injury early in the game and was subsequently replaced by Alex Smith. Washington failed to complete a 20–3 comeback and lost 23–20 when Smith threw two interceptions on the final two possessions. Washington was swept by the Giants for the second consecutive season and the seventh time dating back to the 2008 season.

Week 10: at Detroit Lions 

{{Americanfootballbox
|titlestyle=;text-align:center;
|state=autocollapse
|title=Week 10: Washington Football Team at Detroit Lions – Game summary
|date=November 15
|time=1:00 p.m. EST
|road=Washington
|R1=3|R2=0|R3=7|R4=17
|home=Lions
|H1=7|H2=10|H3=7|H4=6
|stadium=Ford Field, Detroit, Michigan
|attendance=0
|weather=None (indoor stadium)
|referee=Alex Kemp
|TV=Fox
|TVAnnouncers=Dan Hellie, Aqib Talib and Megan Olivi
|reference=Recap, Game Book
|scoring=
First quarter
 DET - Marvin Hall 55 yard pass from Matthew Stafford (Matt Prater kick), 7:12. Lions 7–0. Drive: 5 plays, 92 yards, 1:52.
 WAS – Dustin Hopkins 38 yard field goal, 3:25. Lions 7–3. Drive: 9 plays, 54 yards, 3:47.
Second quarter
 DET – Marvin Jones 27 yard pass from Matthew Stafford (Matt Prater kick), 11:55. Lions 14–3. Drive: 6 plays, 53 yards, 2:07.
 DET – Matt Prater 53 yard field goal, 0:08. Lions 17–3. Drive: 7 plays, 34 yards, 1:06.
Third quarter
 DET – D'Andre Swift 15 yard pass from Matthew Stafford (Matt Prater kick), 7:58. Lions 24–3. Drive: 11 plays, 75 yards, 7:02.
 WAS – J. D. McKissic 2 yard run (Dustin Hopkins kick), 2:30. Lions 24–10. Drive: 11 plays, 82 yards, 5:28.
Fourth quarter
 WAS – Antonio Gibson 2 yard run (Dustin Hopkins kick), 11:21. Lions 24–17. Drive: 11 plays, 84 yards, 4:39.
 WAS – Antonio Gibson 5 yard run (Dustin Hopkins kick), 6:09. Tied 24–24. Drive: 6 plays, 66 yards, 2:44.
 DET – Matt Prater 37 yard field goal, 2:37. Lions 27–24.  Drive: 11 plays, 56 yards, 3:32.
 WAS – Dustin Hopkins 41 yard field goal, 0:16. Tied 27–27. Drive: 17 plays, 66 yards, 2:21.
 DET – Matt Prater 59 yard field goal, 0:00. Lions 30–27. Drive: 3 plays, 34 yards, 0:16.
|stats=
Top passers
 WAS – Alex Smith – 38/55, 390 yards
 DET – Matthew Stafford – 24/33, 276 yards, 3 TDs
Top rushers
 WAS – Antonio Gibson – 13 rushes, 45 yards, 2 TDs
 DET – D'Andre Swift – 16 rushes, 81 yards
Top receivers
 WAS – Terry McLaurin – 7 receptions, 95 yards
 DET – Marvin Jones – 8 receptions, 96 yards, TD
}}
Alex Smith started his first game since Week 11 of the 2018 season. After falling behind 24–3, Smith and the offense rallied with three straight touchdowns by running backs Antonio Gibson and J. D. McKissic in the second half to tie the game at 24. The Lions responded with a field goal and Washington responded with one of their own to tie the game at 27 with 16 seconds to play. However, on the ensuing Detroit drive, kicker Matt Prater drilled a 59-yard field goal as the clock expired. Washington fell to 2–7 after the crushing loss.

 Week 11: vs. Cincinnati Bengals 

The Bengals were playing a close game against Washington until the third quarter when Bengals rookie quarterback and Heisman Trophy winner Joe Burrow suffered a season-ending knee injury. The Bengals were unable to move the ball with backup Ryan Finley and Washington took control of the game. With the win on Homecoming Weekend, the team improved to 3–7, matching their win total from the previous season. This was Washington's first victory over Cincinnati since their 1991 Super Bowl-winning season and their first at home since 1985.

 Week 12: at Dallas Cowboys 
NFL on Thanksgiving Day

Washington and Dallas played on Thanksgiving afternoon for the 10th time in the rivalry's history. After a close first half, Washington went on a run of 21 unanswered points in the fourth quarter, including a 15-yard interception return for a touchdown by Montez Sweat, the first of his career. Antonio Gibson became the first rookie with three touchdowns on Thanksgiving since Randy Moss in 1998. With the win, Washington improved to 4–7 and swept Dallas for the first time since 2012 and only the second time since 2005. Washington also won in Dallas on Thanksgiving for the second time ever, the first since 2012, and won for the fourth time on the holiday all-time, their first since 2017.

 Week 13: at Pittsburgh Steelers 

The game was originally scheduled for Sunday, but was postponed to Monday due to scheduling changes amid the COVID-19 pandemic. While down 14–0 in the second quarter, Washington got a quick field goal before halftime and opened the second half with a Peyton Barber touchdown run to cut the deficit to 14–10 before the Steelers offense regained possession. Their defense clamped down, only allowing 120 total yards in the second half. Logan Thomas tied the game mid-way through the fourth quarter while Jon Bostic intercepted a pass tipped by Montez Sweat with 1:59 to play. Kicker Dustin Hopkins made two field goals to put the game at 23–17, which the Steelers were not able to recover from. With the win, Washington improved to 5–7, having won three straight games for the first time since Weeks 6–8 of the 2018 season. This was also Washington's first win over Pittsburgh since their 1991 Super Bowl-winning season.

 Week 14: at San Francisco 49ers 

With scores from rookie defenders Chase Young and Kamren Curl, Washington scored two defensive touchdowns in a game for the first time since Week 17 of the 1997 season, when Darryl Pounds and Hall of Famer Darrell Green accomplished this feat. With the win, Washington improved their record to 6–7 and, with the Giants' loss to the Arizona Cardinals earlier that day, took over sole possession of first place in the NFC East. Washington also won four games in a row for the first time since 2016.

 Week 15: vs. Seattle Seahawks 

With the loss, Washington fell to 6–8 and failed to clinch their first winning season since 2016.

 Week 16: vs. Carolina Panthers 

With a Giants loss to the Baltimore Ravens earlier that afternoon, Washington had an opportunity to clinch the division title against Carolina. The team instead put together a performance of errors, including a mishandled punt by Steven Sims that was recovered for a Panthers touchdown, a 10-play scoring drive of all run plays allowed by the defense and an additional three turnovers from Dwayne Haskins, who was eventually benched in the fourth quarter for Taylor Heinicke. With their second consecutive loss, the team dropped to 6–9 and clinched their fourth straight losing season. Haskins was released by the team the following day.

 Week 17: at Philadelphia Eagles 

In a matchup that was flexed to NBC Sunday Night Football'', Washington defeated the Eagles 20–14 to clinch the NFC East for the first time since the 2015 season. This was Washington's first sweep of Philadelphia since the 2016 season. With a final record of 7–9, Washington became just the third team in league history to win their division with a losing record after the 2010 Seattle Seahawks and 2014 Carolina Panthers, the latter of whom were also coached by Rivera. They also became the first team in NFL history to clinch a playoff berth after starting the season 2–7.

Standings

Division

Conference

Postseason

Schedule

Game summaries

NFC Wild Card Playoffs: vs. (5) Tampa Bay Buccaneers

Despite a late comeback and a strong performance from quarterback Taylor Heinicke, Washington's season ended at the hands of Tom Brady and the eventual Super Bowl LV champion Tampa Bay Buccaneers with a 31–23 home loss. It was Washington's fifth straight playoff loss dating back to 2005 and their third consecutive home playoff loss dating back to 1999.

Notes

References

External links
 

Washington
Washington Football Team seasons
Washington Football Team
NFC East championship seasons